The 2010 British Formula 3 International Series was the 60th British Formula 3 International Series season. It began on 3 April at Oulton Park and finished on 26 September at Brands Hatch after 30 races at ten meetings, held in the United Kingdom, France, Germany and Belgium.

For the third season in succession, a Red Bull Junior Team-supported Carlin Motorsport driver won the championship title. Following on from the successes of Jaime Alguersuari in 2008 and Daniel Ricciardo in 2009, Frenchman Jean-Éric Vergne won the title with two meetings to spare after taking twelve victories in the first 24 races. Vergne eventually finished with thirteen victories and 29 points-scoring finishes – his only failure was a mistake in the wet, final race at Brands Hatch when he slid off the road – as he finished 99 points clear of his team-mate James Calado. Both drivers received a Formula Renault 3.5 Series test for their performances. Calado's five wins helped him to fend off Fortec Motorsport's Oliver Webb, a three-time winner, in the battle for second place in the standings.

Webb's early season form of seven top-two placings in the first nine races had given him the championship lead over Vergne and a 48-point advantage over Calado, but the Carlin driver overhauled his rival following an unbroken of points finishes to the end of the season, while Webb suffered four races where he did not score any points, to end up 43 points behind at season's end. A late season surge by a third Carlin driver, Adriano Buzaid put him within reach of Webb's third place at the final round, but Webb eventually held on by twelve points. Buzaid had taken seven successive podiums, including his only two victories of the season coming at Silverstone and Snetterton. Three other race-winners battled for fifth place in the championship, with Felipe Nasr overhauling both Gabriel Dias and Rupert Svendsen-Cook at the final race of the season. The only other drivers to win a race were reigning National Class champion Daniel McKenzie, who took two wins to an eventual tenth place championship finish, and Alexander Sims, who won at Silverstone while competing in one of two guest appearances with his Formula 3 Euro Series team ART Grand Prix.

The National Class for older-specification machinery was an in-house battle between two T-Sport drivers as Menasheh Idafar and James Cole were the only drivers to compete in all of the meetings; only four drivers competed in the class at all in 2010, with Luiz Razia – who competed at the May Silverstone meeting, to learn the circuit ahead of the GP2 Series meeting later in the season – and Juan Carlos Sistos – who contested the August Silverstone and Snetterton meetings – the only others to compete alongside the T-Sport pair. Idafar eventually won the National Class title by 17 points, taking 17 wins to Cole's twelve, including an overall third-place finish at the final race at Brands Hatch. Sistos took the other victory, finishing ahead of Cole and Idafar on his début in the championship.

Drivers and teams

Calendar
The calendar was announced on 7 January 2010. It consisted of ten rounds, with three races at each round. A race weekend consisted of a half-hour first race, a 20-minute "half points" sprint featuring a "semi-reverse" grid, and finally a 40-minute feature race designed to place the emphasis on driver stamina, racecraft and mechanical reliability. From Rockingham onwards, pit stops were implemented during the 20-minute race, in which drivers had to pit inside a 15-minute pit stop window.

 1 Fastest lap recorded by Alexander Sims, but he was ineligible to score the fastest lap point.

Standings
With an extra round at each meeting, the championship's point system was altered slightly for the 2010 season. The first and third races offered points using the system that had been used in 2009 (20-15-12-10-8-6-4-3-2-1), with an extra point for the fastest lap. The second race again saw the top ten being awarded points, but the points system rewarded less points; using the points scale 10-9-8-7-6-5-4-3-2-1, with two points for fastest lap.

See also
 2010 Formula 3 Euro Series season
 2010 GP3 Series
 2010 Masters of Formula 3
 2010 Macau Grand Prix

References

External links
 The official website of the British Formula 3 Championship

British Formula Three Championship seasons
Formula Three season
British
British Formula 3 Championship